Timothy Hugh Clutton-Brock  (born 13 August 1946) is a British zoologist known for his comparative studies of the behavioural ecology of mammals, particularly red deer and meerkats.

Education
Clutton-Brock was educated at the University of Cambridge where he was awarded a PhD in 1972.

Career and research
As of 2008, he is the Prince Philip Professor of Ecology and Evolutionary Biology, and head of the Large Animal Research Group at the Department of Zoology of the University of Cambridge, and a fellow of Magdalene College, Cambridge.
He also holds extraordinary professorships in the Department of Zoology and Entomology and the Mammal Research Institute of the University of Pretoria, South Africa.

Clutton-Brock's early work was on social behaviour in primates. Much of his recent work focuses on three long-term studies: of Red Deer on the Scottish island of Rùm, of Soay sheep on St Kilda, and of meerkats in the southern Kalahari. He is one of the founders of the Kalahari Meerkat Project, the subjects of which are featured in the television programme Meerkat Manor.

Books
 Readings in Sociobiology. Editor with Paul H. Harvey. (1978, W.H.Freeman & Company)
 Red Deer: Behavior and Ecology of Two Sexes. With F. E. Guinness and S. D. Albon. (1982, University Of Chicago Press)
 Life Histories in Comparative Perspective. With P.H. Harvey and R.D. Martin, R.D. (1987) In Primate Societies. Smuts, B.B., Cheney, D.L., Seyfarth, R.M., Wrangham, R.W., Struhsaker, T.T. (eds). Chicago & London:University of Chicago Press. pp. 181–196 
 Rhum: The Natural History of an Island (Edinburgh Island Biology). Editor with M. E. Ball. (1987, Edinburgh University Press)
 Reproductive Success: Studies of Individual Variation in Contrasting Breeding Systems (Editor, 1990, University Of Chicago Press)
 The Evolution of Parental Care (1991, Princeton University Press)
 Changes and Disturbance in Tropical Rainforest in SouthEast Asia. Editor with David M. G. Newbery and Ghillean T. Prance. (2000, World Scientific Publishing Company)
 Wildlife Population Growth Rates. Editor with R. M. Sibly and J. Hone. (2003, Cambridge University Press)
 Soay Sheep: Dynamics and Selection in an Island Population. Editor with Josephine Pemberton. (2004, Cambridge University Press)
 Meerkat Manor – The Story of Flower of the Kalahari (2007, Weidenfeld & Nicolson)
 Mammal Societies (2016, Wiley-Blackwell)

Reviews

Articles
 
 
 
 
 
 Lukas, D., & Clutton-Brock, T. H. (August 2013). "The evolution of social monogamy in mammals". Science.341: 526-530. doi:10.1126/science.1238677

Awards and honours
He was elected a Fellow of the Royal Society in 1987. He is an ISI Highly Cited researcher.
He won the 1997 Frink Medal of the Zoological Society of London.

In 2012, he was awarded the Darwin Medal from the Royal Society for his work on the diversity of animal societies and demonstration of their effects on the evolution of reproductive strategies, and the operation of selection and the dynamics of populations.

References

1946 births
Living people
Fellows of the Royal Society
Fellows of Magdalene College, Cambridge
British zoologists
Academic staff of the University of Pretoria